Yuj (also Romanized as Yūj) is a village in Rudbar-e alamout Rural District, Alamut-e Gharbi District, Qazvin County, Qazvin Province, Iran. At the 2006 census, its population was 147, in 52 families.

References 

Populated places in Qazvin County